Oliver Johnson (born December 25, 1942) is a retired American basketball player.  He was an All-American forward at the University of San Francisco and a first-round draft pick in the National Basketball Association (NBA) in 1965.

Johnson,  A 6'7 power forward,  was a 3-time All Interhigh and 2-time All MET playing for William Roundtree at Spingarn HS. Johnson teamed with Dave Bing to win the DC Interhigh Titles in ‘60 and ‘61 and a City Championship vs DeMatha in 1961,in front of a sold out crowd (10,500) at the  U of Maryland's Cole Field House. Johnson averaged 19.9 pts and 17.5 rebounds for his senior season.

Johnson played college basketball at the University of San Francisco from 1962 to 1965.  At USF, Johnson was a first team All-West Coast Conference pick each of his three years there (freshmen were ineligible) and was named WCC player of the year as a junior and senior.  Johnson led the Dons to WCC championships and NCAA tournament appearances in all three of his seasons.  The Dons lost in the West regional final in consecutive years to eventual champion UCLA.  In the 1965 NCAA tournament, Johnson led all players in scoring in rebounding average as he tallied 36 points and 18.5 rebounds per game.

For his career, Ollie Johnson scored 1,668 points (19.9 per game) and grabbed 1,323 rebounds (15.8 per game), ranking him in the school's top ten all-time in both categories.  In addition to his conference accolades, Johnson was named an All-American in 1964 and 1965.

Johnson was drafted in the first round of the 1965 NBA draft by the Boston Celtics (8th pick overall), but he never played in the NBA.  Before being cut by the Celtics, he played for the San Francisco Athletic Club in the Amateur Athletic Union, where he was named an AAU All-American in 1965. He then played overseas in the Basketball League Belgium for three seasons.

References

External links
 College stats at the Draft Review

1942 births
Living people
All-American college men's basketball players
Amateur Athletic Union men's basketball players
American expatriate basketball people in Belgium
American men's basketball players
Basketball players from Washington, D.C.
Boston Celtics draft picks
Power forwards (basketball)
San Francisco Dons men's basketball players